Bebearia subtentyris, the upland plain forester, is a butterfly in the family Nymphalidae. It is found in Cameroon. The habitat consists of sub-montane forests.

Subspecies
Bebearia subtentyris subtentyris (western Cameroon)
Bebearia subtentyris phoebeensis Hecq, 1996 (Cameroon)

References

Butterflies described in 1912
subtentyris
Endemic fauna of Cameroon
Butterflies of Africa